The Boyd Mounds Site (22MD512) is an archaeological site from the Late Woodland and Early Mississippian period located in Madison County, Mississippi near Ridgeland. Many of the mounds were excavated by The National Park Service in 1964. It is located at mile 106.9 on the old Natchez Trace, now the Natchez Trace Parkway. It was added to the NRHP on July 14, 1989 as NRIS number 89000784.

Description
The site consists of six burial mounds dating to the Late Woodland and Early Mississippian period. Of the six mounds at the site, Mound 2 is situated next to a parking area off the Natchez Trace Parkway and is accessible to visitors. Excavations done by the National Park Service in the early 1960s showed that the mound was initially two mounds that were constructed side by side but were later joined together when a new layer of earth was added to create a single oblong mound. Excavators also found the remains of forty one individuals, and an array of artifacts such as pottery in the mound.

See also
 List of Mississippian sites
 Old Natchez Trace segments listed on the National Register of Historic Places.

References

External links

 Boyd Mounds at NatchezTraceTravel.com

Mounds in Mississippi
Late Mississippian culture
Woodland period
Natchez Trace
Protected areas of Madison County, Mississippi
Archaeological sites on the National Register of Historic Places in Mississippi
National Register of Historic Places in Madison County, Mississippi